It's Not Over is the sixth album by the group Shooting Star. This is the first Shooting Star album not to feature founding members Gary West, Steve Thomas, and Charles Waltz; and the first to feature their replacements: vocalist Keith Mitchell, keyboardist Dennis Laffoon, and drummer Rod Lincoln. It is also the first Shooting Star album to feature original bassist Ron Verlin since 1983's Burning.

Track listing
All songs written by Van McLain, except 3, written by McLain and Dennis Laffoon, and tracks 5, 7, and 9, written by McLain and Gary West.

Personnel
Keith Mitchell – lead vocals
Van McLain – guitars, backing vocals
Dennis Laffoon – keyboards, backing vocals
Ron Verlin – bass
Rod Lincoln – drums

References

1991 albums
Shooting Star (band) albums